Fellows of the Royal Society elected in 2002.

Fellows 

Allan Bradley
Robin Carrell
Michael John Crawley
Stuart Cull-Candy
John Dainton
Roger John Davis
Anne Dell
David Dolphin
David Fowler
Steve Furber
Graham Goodwin
Jean-Pierre Hansen
Nicholas Hastie
Christopher Hawkesworth
Judith Howard
Philip Ingham
David Ish-Horowicz
James A. Jackson
Bruce Ernest Kemp
John Vincent Kilmartin
David Malcolm James Lilley
Terry Lyons
Georgina Mace
John McCanny
Brian Cecil Joseph Moore
David Parker
Martyn Poliakoff
Eric Priest
Terence Quinn
Peter John Ratcliffe
Mary Rees
Miles Reid
David Rhind
Thomas Maurice Rice
Roy Sambles
Peter Sarnak
Anthony Ronald Entrican Sinclair
Andrew Benjamin Smith
Anthony John Stace
Nicholas Strausfeld
Mark Welland
Ian Wilmut

Foreign members

Claude Jean Allegre
Per Oskar Andersen
Hubert Simon Markl
Alexander Pines
Peter Raven
Carl Isaac Wunsch

References

2002
2002 in science
2002 in the United Kingdom